Selim I (10 October 1470 – 22 September 1520), known as Selim the Grim or Selim the Resolute, was the Sultan of the Ottoman Empire from 1512 to 1520. Despite lasting only eight years, his reign is notable for the enormous expansion of the Empire, particularly his conquest between 1516 and 1517 of the entire Mamluk Sultanate of Egypt, which included all of the Levant, Hejaz, Tihamah and Egypt itself.

Selim's conquest of the Middle Eastern heartlands of the Muslim world, and particularly his assumption of the role of guardian of the pilgrimage routes to Mecca and Medina, established the Ottoman Empire as the pre-eminent Muslim state. His conquests dramatically shifted the empire's geographical and cultural center of gravity away from the Balkans and toward the Middle East. By the eighteenth century, Selim's conquest of the Mamluk Sultanate had come to be romanticized as the moment when the Ottomans seized leadership over the rest of the Muslim world, and consequently Selim is popularly remembered as the first legitimate Ottoman Caliph, although stories of an official transfer of the caliphal office from the Mamluk Abbasid dynasty to the Ottomans were a later invention.

Early life 
Born in Amasya around 1470, Selim was the youngest son of Şehzade Bayezid (later Bayezid II). His mother was Gülbahar Hatun, a Turkish princess from the Dulkadir State centered around Elbistan in Maraş; her father was Alaüddevle Bozkurt Bey, the eleventh ruler of the Dulkadirs. Some academics state that Selim's mother was a lady named Gülbahar, while chronological analysis suggests that his biological mother's name could also have been Ayşe Hatun.

Reign

Governor of Trabzon 
During his reign as governor of Trabzon Selim had earned a great reputation among his military men for his confrontations with the Safavids, slave raids and campaign in the Caucasus against Georgia. Selim defeated a Safavid army in 1505, when Shah Ismail’s brother led a 3,000-strong Safavid army against Selim, Selim routed the army, massacred many and seized their arms and munitions. In 1507 he defeated the Safavids again in the Battle of Erzincan, after Shah Ismail marched through Ottoman lands to attack the Dulkadirids Selim attacked Erzincan and defeated a Safavid army sent against him by Shah Ismail. The following year he invaded the Caucasus, he subdued western Georgia, brought Imereti and Guria under Ottoman domination and seized a large number of slaves. In 1510 he defeated the Safavids again in the Campaign of Trabzon.

Accession 
By 1512 Şehzade Ahmed was the favorite candidate to succeed his father. Bayezid, who was reluctant to continue his rule over the empire, announced Ahmet as heir apparent to the throne. Angered by this announcement, Selim rebelled, and while he lost the first battle against his father's forces, Selim ultimately dethroned his father. Selim commanded 30,000 men, whereas his father led 40,000. Selim only escaped with 3,000 men. This marked the first time that an Ottoman prince openly rebelled against his father with an army of his own. Selim ordered the exile of Bayezid to a distant "sanjak", Dimetoka (in the north-east of present-day Greece). Bayezid died immediately thereafter. Selim put his brothers (Şehzade Ahmet and Şehzade Korkut) and nephews to death upon his accession. His nephew Şehzade Murad, son of the legal heir to the throne Şehzade Ahmet, fled to the neighboring Safavid Empire after his expected support failed to materialize. This fratricidal policy was motivated by bouts of civil strife that had been sparked by the antagonism between Selim's father and his uncle, Cem Sultan, and between Selim himself and his brother Ahmet.

Alevi unrest 

After many centuries of calm, the Alevi population was active while Selim I was the sultan, and they seem to have been backed by the Qizilbash of Iran.

Conquest of the Middle East

Safavid Empire

One of Selim's first challenges as Sultan involved the growing tension between the Ottoman Empire and the Safavid Empire led by Shah Ismail, who had recently brought the Safavids to power and had switched the Persian state religion from Sunni Islam to adherence to the Twelver branch of Shia Islam. By 1510 Ismail had conquered the whole of Iran and Azerbaijan, southern Dagestan (with its important city of Derbent), Mesopotamia, Armenia, Khorasan, Eastern Anatolia, and had made the Georgian kingdoms of Kartli and Kakheti his vassals. He was a great threat to his Sunni Muslim neighbors to the west. In 1511 Ismail had supported a pro-Shia/Safavid uprising in Anatolia, the Şahkulu Rebellion.

Early in his reign, Selim created a list of all Shiites ages 7 to 70 in a number of central Anatolian cities including Tokat, Sivas and Amasya. As Selim marched through these cities, his forces rounded up and executed all the Shiites they could find. Most of them were beheaded. The massacre was the largest in Ottoman history, until the end of the 19th century.

In 1514 Selim I attacked Ismail's kingdom to stop the spread of Shiism into Ottoman dominions. Selim and Ismā'il had exchanged a series of belligerent letters prior to the attack. On his march to face Ismā'il, Selim had 50,000 Alevis massacred, seeing them as enemies of the Ottoman Empire. Selim I defeated Ismā'il at the Battle of Chaldiran in 1514. Ismā'il's army was more mobile and his soldiers better prepared, but the Ottomans prevailed due in large part to their efficient modern army, possession of artillery, black powder and muskets. Ismā'il was wounded and almost captured in battle, and Selim I entered the Iranian capital of Tabriz in triumph on 5 September, but did not linger. The Battle of Chaldiran was of historical significance: the reluctance of Shah Ismail to accept the advantages of modern firearms and the importance of artillery proved decisive. After the battle, Selim, referring to Ismail, stated that his adversary was: "Always drunk to the point of losing his mind and totally neglectful of the affairs of the state".

Syria, Palestine, Egypt and the Arabian Peninsula

Selim then conquered the Mamluk Sultanate of Egypt, defeating the Mamluk Egyptians first at the Battle of Marj Dabiq (24 August 1516), and then at the Battle of Ridanieh (22 January 1517). This led to the Ottoman annexation of the entire sultanate, from Syria and Palestine in Sham, to Hejaz and Tihamah in the Arabian Peninsula, and ultimately Egypt itself. This permitted Selim to extend Ottoman power to the Muslim holy cities of Mecca and Medina, hitherto under Egyptian rule. Rather than style himself the Ḥākimü'l-Ḥaremeyn, or The Ruler of The Two Holy Cities, he accepted the more pious title Ḫādimü'l-Ḥaremeyn, or The Servant of The Two Holy Cities.

The last Abbasid caliph, al-Mutawakkil III, was residing in Cairo as a Mamluk puppet at the time of the Ottoman conquest. He was subsequently sent into exile in Istanbul. In the eighteenth century, a story emerged claiming that he had officially transferred his title to the Caliphate to Selim at the time of the conquest. In fact, Selim did not make any claim to exercise the sacred authority of the office of caliph, and the notion of an official transfer was a later invention.

After conquering Damascus in 1516, Selim ordered the restoration of the tomb of Ibn Arabi (d. 1240), a famous Sufi master who was highly revered among Ottoman Sufis.

Death 

A planned campaign westward was cut short when Selim was overwhelmed by sickness and subsequently died in the ninth year of his reign aged 49. Officially, it is said that Selim succumbed to a mistreated carbuncle. Some historians, however, suggest that he died of cancer or that his physician poisoned him. Other historians have noted that Selim's death coincided with a period of plague in the empire, and have added that several sources imply that Selim himself suffered from the disease.

On 22 September 1520 Sultan Selim I's eight-year reign came to an end. Selim died and was brought to Istanbul, so he could be buried in Yavuz Selim Mosque which Sultan Suleiman the Magnificent commissioned in loving memory of his father. Sultan Selim I had conquered and unified the Islamic holy lands. Protecting the lands in Europe, he gave priority to the East, as he believed the real danger came from there.

Personality 

By most accounts, Selim had a fiery temper and had very high expectations of those below him. Several of his viziers were executed for various reasons. A famous anecdote relates how another vizier playfully asked the Sultan for some preliminary notice of his doom so that he might have time to put his affairs in order. The Sultan laughed and replied that indeed he had been thinking of having the vizier killed, but had no one fit to take his place, otherwise he would gladly oblige. A popular Ottoman curse was, "May you be a vizier of Selim's," as a reference to the number of viziers he had executed.

Selim was one of the Empire's most successful and respected rulers, being energetic and hardworking. During his short eight years of ruling, he accomplished momentous success. Despite the length of his reign, many historians agree that Selim prepared the Ottoman Empire to reach its zenith under the reign of his son and successor, Suleiman the Magnificent.

Selim was also a distinguished poet who wrote both Turkish and Persian verse under the nickname Mahlas Selimi; collections of his Persian poetry are extant today.

Foreign relations

Relations with Shah Ismail
While marching into Persia in 1514, Selim's troops suffered from the scorched-earth tactics of Shah Ismail. The Sultan hoped to lure Ismail into an open battle before his troops starved to death, and began writing insulting letters to the Shah, accusing him of cowardice:

Ismail responded to Selim's third message, quoted above, by having an envoy deliver a letter accompanied by a box of opium. The Shah's letter insultingly implied that Selim's prose was the work of an unqualified writer on drugs. Selim was enraged by the Shah's denigration of his literary talent and ordered the Persian envoy to be torn to pieces.

Outside of their military conflicts, Selim I and Shah Ismail clashed on the economic front as well. Opposed to Shah Ismail's adherence to the Shia sect of Islam (contrasting his Sunni beliefs), Selim I and his father before him "did not really accept his basic political and religious legitimacy," beginning the portrayal of the Safavids in Ottoman chronicles as kuffar. After the Battle of Chaldiran, Selim I's minimal tolerance for Shah Ismail disintegrated, and he began a short era of closed borders with the Safavid Empire.

Selim I wanted to use the Ottoman Empire's central location to completely cut the ties between Shah Ismail's Safavid Empire and the rest of the world. Even though the raw materials for important Ottoman silk production at that time came from Persia rather than developed within the Ottoman Empire itself, he imposed a strict embargo on Iranian silk in an attempt to collapse their economy. For a short amount of time, the silk resources were imported via the Mamluk territory of Aleppo, but by 1517, Selim I had conquered the Mamluk state and the trade fully came to a standstill. So strict was this embargo that, "merchants who had been incautious enough not to immediately leave Ottoman territory when war was declared had their goods taken away and were imprisoned," and to emphasize frontier security, sancaks along the border between the two empires were given exclusively to Sunnis and those who did not have any relationship with the Safavid-sympathizing Kızılbaş. Iranian merchants were barred from entering the borders of the Ottoman Empire under Selim I. Shah Ismail received revenue via customs duties, therefore after the war to demonstrate his commitment to their thorny rivalry, Selim I halted trade with the Safavids—even at the expense of his empire's own silk industry and citizens.

This embargo and closed borders policy was reversed quickly by his son Suleyman I after Selim I's death in 1520.

Relations with Babur
Babur's early relations with the Ottomans were poor because Selim I provided Babur's rival Ubaydullah Khan with powerful matchlocks and cannons. In 1507, when ordered to accept Selim I as his rightful suzerain, Babur refused and gathered Qizilbash servicemen in order to counter the forces of Ubaydullah Khan during the Battle of Ghazdewan in 1512. In 1513, Selim I reconciled with Babur (fearing that he would join the Safavids), dispatched Ustad Ali Quli and Mustafa Rumi, and many other Ottoman Turks, in order to assist Babur in his conquests; this particular assistance proved to be the basis of future Mughal-Ottoman relations. From them, he also adopted the tactic of using matchlocks and cannons in field (rather than only in sieges), which would give him an important advantage in India.

Family

Consorts
Selim I had two know consorts and several unknown concubines: 
 Hafsa Hatun, his favorite concubine and mother of his successor, Suleiman the Magnificent. She became the first Valide Sultan in Ottoman history.
 Ayşe Hatun, who entered into Selim's harem after the death of her first consort, Selim's half-brother Şehzade Mehmed.

Sons
Selim had at least six sons:
 Suleiman the Magnificent; 10th Sultan of the Ottoman Empire 
 Şehzade Salih (died 1499, buried in Gülbahar Hatun Mausoleum, Trabzon)
 Şehzade Orhan (? – before 1521)
 Şehzade Musa (? – before 1521)
 Şehzade Korkud (? – before 1521)
 Üveys Pasha; illegitimate son, governor of Yemen

Daughters
Selim had at least ten daughters:
Fatma Sultan, daughter of Hafsa. Married to Mustafa Pasha first, then married to Kara Ahmed Pasha, lastly married to Hadım Ibrahim Pasha.
Hatice Sultan, daughter of Hafsa. Married to Kapudan Iskender Pasha in 1509. Once believed to be remarried with Pargalı Ibrahim Pasha but research revealed that such marriage never occurred. She have re-married instead with Çoban Mustafa Pasha, son of Iskender Pasha and widow of her half-sister Şahzade Sultan. She had at least five sons and three daughters.
Hafize Hafsa Sultan, maybe daughter of Hafsa. She married twice and had a son.
Şah Sultan (buried in Eyüp), married in 1523 to Lütfi Pasha (div.), they had at least one daughter, named Esmehan Hanımsultan
Beyhan Sultan, maybe daughter of Hafsa. Married in 1513 to Ferhad Pasha. She had at least one daughter, Esmehan Hanımsultan.
Gevherhan Sultan, married in 1509 to her cousin Sultanzade Isfendiyaroglu Mehmed Bey (son of Sofu Fatma Sultan, daughter of Bayezid II) and governor of Balıkesir. They had no known children and she was widowed in 1514 when Mehmed died at the Battle of Chaldiran. According to unsubstantiated traditions, she remarried Saadet I, Crimean Khan of the Giray dynasty. If true, she was the mother of Saadet's son Ahmed Pasha.
Şahzade Sultan, known also as Sultanzade Sultan, she married Çoban Mustafa Pasha son of Iskender Pasha. She had at least one daughter, Ayşe Hanımsultan. After her death, her husband married her half-sister Hatice Sultan. Her name means "descendant of the Şah" or "descendant of the Sultan".
Yenişah Sultan. Nothing is known about her but her name, which means "trust of the Şah". It is possible that she or Hanım Sultan was the unnamed princess who married Koca Sinan Pasha and had by him Emine Hanımsultan and Sultanzade Mehmed Pasha and who, after widowed, remarried with Güzelce Mahmud Paşa.
Kamerşah Sultan (meaning "Moon of the Shah" or "Life of the Shah"), died on 27 September 1503 in Trabzon.
Hanım Sultan. Nothing is known about her but her name, which means "lady". Is uncertain of she was really existed or if Hanım is the second name of Hatice Sultan or Şahzade Sultan. It is possible that she or Yenişah Sultan was the unnamed princess who married Koca Sinan Pasha and had by him Emine Hanımsultan and Sultanzade Mehmed Pasha and who, after widowed, remarried with Güzelce Mahmud Paşa.

Legacy
 The drillship Yavuz is named after Selim I.
 A third bridge over the Bosphorus in Istanbul is called the Yavuz Sultan Selim Bridge.

Popular culture 
 Selim I appears as an important character in the action-adventure video game Assassin's Creed: Revelations.
 Selim I is portrayed by Muharrem Gülmez in the Turkish historical television series Magnificent Century.
 Selim I is portrayed as a major antagonist by Mahmoud Nasr in the joint Saudi-Emirati series Kingdoms of Fire.

See also
 Tuman bay II
 Al-Mutawakkil III

References

Further reading
 
 
 
 
 
 Winter, Michael. "The Conquest of Syria and Egypt by Sultan Selim I, According to Evliyâ Çelebi." in ''The Mamluk-Ottoman Transition: Continuity and Change in Egypt and Bilād Al-Shām in the Sixteenth Century' (2016): 127–46.

External links 
 

1470s births
1520 deaths
16th-century Ottoman sultans
Turkish Muslims
Deaths from anthrax
Infectious disease deaths in the Ottoman Empire
Turks from the Ottoman Empire
People of Turkic descent
People from Amasya
Suleiman the Magnificent
Turkish poets
Ottoman people of the Ottoman–Persian Wars
Burials in Turkey
Leaders who took power by coup
Supporters of Ibn Arabi
Divan poets from the Ottoman Empire
16th-century Persian-language poets
Fratricides
Custodian of the Two Holy Mosques